Polia richardsoni is a species of cutworm or dart moth in the family Noctuidae first described by Curtis in 1834. It is found in North America.

The MONA or Hodges number for Polia richardsoni is 10279.

Subspecies
Two subspecies belong to Polia richardsoni:
 Polia richardsoni magna (Barnes & Benjamin, 1924) i g
 Polia richardsoni richardsoni (Curtis, 1834) i g
Data sources: i = ITIS, c = Catalogue of Life, g = GBIF, b = Bugguide.net

References

Further reading

 
 
 

Hadenini
Articles created by Qbugbot
Moths described in 1834